Dan Hoard is an American radio and television sportscaster who calls games for the National Football League's Cincinnati Bengals with Dave Lapham. He is also the play-by-play announcer for University of Cincinnati Bearcats football and men's basketball games.

Early life and education
Hoard grew up in Lakewood, New York and attended Southwestern Central High School. He graduated from Syracuse University's S. I. Newhouse School of Public Communications in 1985. At Syracuse, he was good friends with Sean McDonough.

Career
He began his broadcasting career as the radio voice of the Syracuse Chiefs of the  Minor League Baseball. He transitioned into television as the sports director at WTVH-TV in Syracuse before moving to WXIX-TV in Cincinnati in 1995. In 2000, Hoard added University of Cincinnati football and basketball radio play-by-play duties and soon also began hosting the Cincinnati Reds TV pregame show on Fox Sports Ohio.

In 2006, Hoard returned to baseball play-by-play broadcasting as the TV/radio voice of the Pawtucket Red Sox. In 2011, he moved back to Cincinnati when he was hired to replace Brad Johansen as the radio voice of the Bengals.

Awards
Hoard was named the Ohio Sportscaster of the Year in 2014, 2017, 2019 and 2020 by the National Sports Media Association (NSMA).

He was inducted into the University of Cincinnati James P. Kelly Athletics Hall of Fame in 2019 and the Chautauqua Sports Hall of Fame in 2016.

The minor league baseball broadcaster in the Dancin' Homer episode of The Simpsons is named Dan Hoard. The episode was written by Ken Levine, Dan's former broadcasting partner with the Syracuse Chiefs.

References

External links
Bio on WXIX-TV
Personal blog
Inside the Bearcats Podcast 2013

American radio sports announcers
Cincinnati Reds announcers
Cincinnati Bearcats football announcers
Cincinnati Bengals announcers
College football announcers
College basketball announcers in the United States
Major League Baseball broadcasters
National Football League announcers
S.I. Newhouse School of Public Communications alumni
Television personalities from Cincinnati
Living people
Year of birth missing (living people)